Durg Junction Railway Station, is a junction station located in the Indian state of Chhattisgarh. It serves Durg, Bhilai city and the adjoining areas of it. Durg Junction is the part of South East Central Railway. It is one of the largest railway junctions of Chhattisgarh in terms of network. It is also one of the most prominent and important station in Howrah–Nagpur–Mumbai line. It is an 'A' grade station of Indian Railways in terms of passenger services.

History
Durg railway station started its functioning in 1891. Initially, Durg was the part of Bengal Nagpur Railway. The Nagpur–Asansol main line of Bengal Nagpur Railway which came up in 1891 covered Durg station for the first time.  The cross-country Howrah–Nagpur–Mumbai line, opened in 1890, Is the second longest and one of the most important routes in India which passes through Durg railway station.

Bhilai Steel Plant, inaugurated on 4 February 1959, enhanced the importance of Durg railway station as passenger movement through here boosted a lot.

Railway reorganization
The Bengal Nagpur Railway was nationalized in 1944. Eastern Railway was formed on 14 April 1952 with the portion of East Indian Railway Company east of Mughalsarai and the Bengal Nagpur Railway. In 1955, South Eastern Railway was carved out of Eastern Railway. It comprised lines mostly operated by BNR earlier. Amongst the new zones started in April 2003 were East Coast Railway  and South East Central Railway. Both these railways were carved out of South Eastern Railway. Now it is the part of South East Central Railway in Raipur Junction Division. Now almost 120 trains pass from here and 45 trains originate and terminate from

Electrification
The Bilaspur–Bhilai and Bhilai–Durg sections were  electrified in 1944–45. The Durg Junction railway station got completely electrified by June 1945, Durg–Paniajob section in 1970–71. The Paniajob–Gondia and Gondia–Bhandara Road sections in 1971–72, Bhandara Road–Tharsa and Tharsa–Nagpur sections in 1989–90.

References

External links

Railway stations in Durg district
Raipur railway division
Railway junction stations in Chhattisgarh
Railway stations in India opened in 1891
Buildings and structures in Durg
Transport in Durg